Kendal (1883–1908) was an English Thoroughbred racehorse. He was trained at Kingsclere by John Porter for the 1st Duke of Westminster. He was a leading two-year-old, but retired due to injury. He later became a successful stallion and was Champion sire in 1897.

Race career
In his first race Kendal won the Mostyn Plate at Chester. He was then second to Saraband in the New Stakes at Ascot. Next he won the Stockbridge Post Sweepsteakes. He then won the July Stakes at Newmarket by ¾ length from Mephisto in a field that also included St. Mirin. Kendal next won the Ham Stakes at Goodwood. He also won the Great Breeders' Convivial Produce Stakes at the Ebor Meeting at York. He then won the Municipal Stakes in a walkover. In his last race he finished fourth in the Rous Memorial Stakes at Newmarket. Due to a leg injury sustained shortly after the Municipal Stakes he was retired to stud and never raced as a three-year-old.

Stud career
Kendal became a successful stallion and was Champion sire in 1897. He most notable son was Galtee More, winner of the Middle Park Plate, 2000 Guineas, Epsom Derby, Prince of Wales's Stakes and St Leger Stakes. His stud fee for 1898 was 200 guineas, plus one guinea for the groom. Kendal died in 1908.

Pedigree

Note: b. = Bay, br. = Brown, ch. = Chestnut

References

1883 racehorse births
1908 racehorse deaths
Racehorses trained in the United Kingdom
Racehorses bred in the United Kingdom
Thoroughbred family 16-b